The Franklin D. Roosevelt East River Drive, commonly called the FDR Drive for short, is a  limited-access parkway on the east side of the New York City borough of Manhattan. It starts near South and Broad Streets, just north of the Battery Park Underpass, and runs north along the East River to the 125th Street / Robert F. Kennedy Bridge / Willis Avenue Bridge interchange, where it becomes the Harlem River Drive. All of the FDR Drive is designated New York State Route 907L (NY 907L), an unsigned reference route.

The FDR Drive features a mix of below-grade, at-grade, and elevated sections, as well as three partially covered tunnels. The parkway is mostly three lanes in each direction, except for several small sections.

By law, the current weight limits on the FDR Drive from 23rd Street to the Harlem River Drive in both directions is posted . Buses are not allowed to use the roadway north of 23rd Street because they exceed the road's maximum clearance and weight (although some do, including the MTA's  express buses). All commercial vehicles (including trucks) are banned from all sections of the FDR Drive, except for a short section just north of the Battery Park Underpass where the northbound lanes temporarily merge with South Street.

Route description
The East River Greenway runs below, beside, or above the FDR Drive along nearly its entire length, except for a section between 38th and 60th Streets. A plaque dedicating the East River Drive is visible on the southbound roadway before entering the Gracie Mansion tunnel at 90th Street.

Downtown

FDR Drive starts at the southern tip of Manhattan at South and Whitehall Streets in the Financial District. It rises from the underground Battery Park Underpass to an elevated viaduct above South Street, with an at-grade connection to South Street at exit 1. The elevated viaduct continues northeast, with an interchange at Brooklyn Bridge at exit 2. The elevated road, also known as the South Street Viaduct, continues until Gouverneur Slip, near the Manhattan Bridge interchange (exit 3), where there are a southbound exit and northbound entrance. From here, the road is at-grade, with a southbound exit/entrance at Grand Street, exit 4.

The FDR Drive continues north through Lower East Side and Alphabet City, and dips under Houston Street at exit 5, in a three-way interchange. It continues north as an at-grade road. Between 14th and 15th Streets, the FDR Drive passes a large Con Edison substation. The substation is surrounded by ramps for the former exit 6, a southbound exit and entrance which was closed after September 11, 2001.

By 18th Street, the FDR Drive curves north onto an elevated viaduct above Avenue C. The elevated viaduct continues until 25th Street to serve the 23rd Street interchange at exit 7. This exit serves the neighborhood of Kips Bay. At 23rd Street, Avenue C continues as the northbound service road for the FDR Drive, while the southbound lanes split from the main highway at 25th Street.

Midtown

The FDR Drive continues north as an at-grade road, with the Waterside Plaza complex located along the East River to the east of the parkway. The southbound lanes ascend to a viaduct at 28th Street, and the southbound lanes ascend at 30th Street. There are a southbound entrance and northbound exit at ground level at 28th-30th Streets, where the southbound service road begins again. The northbound exit, labeled exit 8, serves 34th Street in Murray Hill, which is located four blocks north; the FDR Drive service road curves underneath the main highway until 36th Street. Another southbound entrance is located at 34th Street itself, and rises to the viaduct level.

At 38th Street, the northbound-only exit 9 for 42nd Street, serving Turtle Bay, splits from FDR Drive. Exit 9 continues as an elevated ramp until the intersection of 42nd Street and First Avenue, where it becomes the westbound lanes of 42nd Street. The FDR Drive dips onto street level and merges with the northbound service road. The southbound service road continues parallel to the FDR Drive, and the southbound exit 8 splits from the parkway near 41st Street. The southbound service road then becomes the eastbound lanes of 42nd Street.

The headquarters of the United Nations was constructed on a platform above the at-grade FDR Drive from 42nd to 48th Streets. The southbound roadway is inside a later structure resembling a tunnel while the northbound roadway is located just outside of the tunnel. This section is often referred to as the United Nations Tunnel, even though only the westernmost lane of the northbound roadway is under the structure.

At 48th Street, the FDR Drive emerges from the United Nations tunnel. A northbound ramp from First Avenue merges onto the northbound roadway. The southbound roadway contains two exits: exit 10 at 49th Street, and exit 11 at 53rd Street. At 54th Street, the road enters the Sutton Place Tunnel, which passes under apartment buildings on the east side of Sutton Place and York Avenue until 60th Street. In this tunnel, the southbound roadway is raised and runs over the northbound roadway for northbound access to and from the Queensboro Bridge interchange (exit 12). As part of the design in this area, numerous homes on the river were demolished and rebuilt or otherwise modified to accommodate the highway. At 63rd Street, the southbound lanes descend to ground level, at the same elevation as the northbound lanes.

Uptown
From 63rd to 71st Streets, the FDR Drive passes under a series of interconnected at-grade tunnels. The segment from 63rd to 68th Street runs under an annex constructed by Rockefeller University, while the section of roadway between 68th and 71st Streets runs underneath the pilotis of the NewYork–Presbyterian Hospital. Afterward, the FDR Drive continues north at ground level. There is a southbound-only entrance and exit, labeled exit 13, at 71st–73rd Streets, serving Lenox Hill on the Upper East Side. Another southbound-only entrance exists at 79th Street; there is no exit from either direction, nor is there any exit number reserved for this interchange.

From 81st to 90th streets runs a final, enclosed double-decker structure. The southbound roadway is again raised over the northbound roadway in a short segment of the tunnel between 81st and 86th Streets. The promenade of Carl Schurz Park was built over the highway in 1939, near Gracie Mansion, the New York City mayor's residence. There is a southbound entrance to the FDR Drive at the intersection of 92nd Street and York Avenue. York Avenue then parallels the FDR Drive until 96th Street, where York Avenue ends. The FDR Drive ascends onto a short elevated viaduct over the 96th Street interchange (exit 14) then descends to street level again.

The remaining portion of the FDR Drive to the 125th Street interchange (exit 19) is at grade, passing through East Harlem. There is a southbound-only entrance at 102nd Street, as well as a southbound-only exit at 106th Street, labeled exit 15. At 116th Street, there is another southbound-only exit and entrance numbered exit 16. When the FDR Drive reaches 120th Street, there are three northbound exits in quick succession: exit 17 for the Robert F. Kennedy Bridge, exit 18 for the Willis Avenue Bridge, and exit 19 for 125th Street. Exit 17 also contains a southbound exit and entrance to and from the Robert F. Kennedy Bridge, and exit 19 also hosts a southbound entrance. The FDR Drive transitions into the Harlem River Drive and continues north after 125th Street.

History

A shorefront parkway in Manhattan along the East River was first proposed by Manhattan Borough President Julius Miller in 1929. The  parkway would extend from South Street to 54th Street. The first sections of the East River Drive were constructed in the 1930s and were designed by Robert Moses. Moses faced the difficulties of building a parkway/boulevard combination along the East River while minimizing disruptions to residents. Many property owners along the East River Drive, especially in Midtown, opposed the boulevard unless noise mitigation measures were added.

The section from 125th Street and the Triborough Bridge ramp south to 92nd Street was completed in 1936. The sections from 92nd Street down to Battery Park (with the exception of a section from 42nd to 49th Streets, located underneath the headquarters of the United Nations) were built as a boulevard running at street level. The first "downtown" section of the boulevard, between Grand and 12th Streets, was completed in June 1937. Two more downtown sections, from 12th to 14th Streets and then from 14th to 18th Streets, were opened in 1939. A short connector from Grand to Montgomery Street was completed in May 1940, which meant that the boulevard was now continuous from Montgomery to 30th Streets. The next month, a large stretch from 49th to 92nd Streets opened. By this point, the only contiguous section that remained to be completed was the stretch between 30th and 49th Streets.

Around this time, city officials started making plans for reconstructing existing sections of the boulevard so that several intersections would be grade-separated or double-decked. A plan to build a three-level section from 81st to 89th Streets was released in April 1940, followed by an East River Drive overpass over 96th Street in June. Due to a bulkhead restriction, a section from 51st to 60th Streets was already being built with two decks.

The section of the East River Drive from 23rd to 34th Streets was completed in October 1941.  Known as the Bristol Basin, this section was built on wartime rubble dumped by cargo ships returning from Bristol, England, during World War II.  The German Luftwaffe bombed Bristol heavily. After delivering war supplies to the British, the ships' crews loaded rubble onto the ships for ballast, then sailed back to New York, where construction crews made use of it. On June 29, 1942, a plaque commemorating the use of rubble was dedicated by Mayor Fiorello LaGuardia, and is currently installed at the Waterside Plaza complex. The final part of the original boulevard, between 34th and 49th Streets, opened in May 1942. Future reconstruction designs from 1948 to 1966 converted the FDR Drive into the full parkway that is in use today.

Upon the death of Franklin Delano Roosevelt, the East River Drive was dedicated to him in June 1945. The drive is now commonly called the "FDR Drive".

An elevated ramp between 18th and 25th Streets, serving as an extension of the highway south of 23rd Street, was completed in 1949, replacing an at-grade section. Another elevated highway above South Street, connecting the at-grade parkway north of Grand Street to the Battery Park Underpass and Brooklyn–Battery Tunnel at the southern tip of Manhattan, was completed in May 1954.

In Kips Bay, the FDR Drive is located on a viaduct between 30th and 37th Streets. The southbound and northbound roadways rise onto a viaduct separately between 28th and 30th Streets; the southbound roadway ascends onto the viaduct at 28th Street, followed by the northbound roadway at 30th Street, and the two roadways merge into a single structure at 32nd Street. At this point, there is a two-lane shoulder on the left side of the northbound roadway, with one of the lanes cordoned off by a short concrete barrier. There is a provision for a southbound exit and northbound entrance at 30th Street, which was built in 1967 and would have connected to the Mid-Manhattan Expressway. However, after plans for the expressway were abandoned, this exit was never used, largely because there was already an exit four blocks north, at 34th Street. The unused exit was then blocked with a semi-permanent concrete barricade.

Exit 6, at 15th Street, formerly passed through a ConEdison substation, which handles most of the electricity for lower Manhattan. It was closed after the September 11, 2001 attacks after city and ConEdison officials concluded it was too risky to allow such easy access to such a critical piece of infrastructure. The exit was permanently removed in 2014 after the New York State Department of Transportation received notification from the New York City Police Department that the exit would not be re-opened since the ConEdison facility was deemed a potential terrorist target. East 15th Street, as well as a corresponding entrance ramp from 14th Street, were also closed east of Avenue C, except to ConEdison and law enforcement vehicles. All signage of exit 6 was removed in early 2016.

Transportation 
The  express buses use the FDR Drive between its start in Lower Manhattan and 23rd Street. In addition, the  use the FDR Drive between the Brooklyn Bridge exit and 34th Street

The  buses use the FDR between Brooklyn Bridge and 23rd Street during the off-peak hours, but during the peak hour, "Midtown Express" buses skip Downtown, running directly up the FDR to 23rd.

Exit list

References

External links

 FDR Drive (Greater New York Roads)

Parkways in New York City
Monuments and memorials to Franklin D. Roosevelt in the United States
Transportation in Manhattan